Yigal Cohen-Orgad (30 August 1937 – 27 August 2019) was an Israeli politician who served as Minister of Finance from October 1983 until September 1984. He was one of the founders of Ariel University, serving as its chancellor until his death.

Biography
Born in Tel Aviv during the Mandate era, Cohen-Orgad studied economics and education at the Hebrew University of Jerusalem. During his youth, he was a member of the Bnei Etzel (Young Irgun) youth movement. In 1962 he started working in the Economic Planning Authority in the Ministry of Finance.

He joined Herut, but left and joined the Free Centre in 1965. He eventually returned to Herut, which by the mid-1970s had become part of the Likud alliance. He became chairman of Herut's economic council, and in 1977, was elected to the Knesset on the Likud list. He changed his name from Yigal Cohen to Yigal Cohen-Orgad to differentiate himself from Yigal Cohen, another Likud MK; "Orgad" was created from the initials of his four children. Re-elected in 1981, he was appointed Minister of Finance in October 1983, replacing Yoram Aridor. Although he retained his seat in the 1984 elections, he was not included in the new cabinet. He lost his Knesset seat in the 1988 elections.

Together with Moshe Arens, Cohen-Orgad was a driving force behind Israeli higher education in the occupied West Bank. Among the active founders of the College of Judea & Samaria, he became the major factor in its development into Ariel University raising millions of dollars from private and public sources.

In 2013 he was presented with Moskowitz Prize for Zionism.

References

External links
 
 Yigal Cohen-Orgad Wins Moskowitz Prize
 Orgad, Israel & the Peace Process
 Cohen-Orgad replaces Aridor
 Cohen Orgad holds burning torch in Betar uniform, before setting out for torch run in first Betaryada

1937 births
2019 deaths
20th-century Israeli civil servants
Academic staff of Ariel University
Betar members
Burials at Yarkon Cemetery
Free Centre politicians
Hebrew University of Jerusalem alumni
Herut politicians
Israeli Jews
Jewish Israeli politicians
Jews in Mandatory Palestine
Likud politicians
Members of the 9th Knesset (1977–1981)
Members of the 10th Knesset (1981–1984)
Members of the 11th Knesset (1984–1988)
Ministers of Finance of Israel
Moskowitz Prize for Zionism laureates
Politicians from Tel Aviv